The Chambermaid may refer to:

 The Chambermaid (film), a 2018 Mexican film
 The Chambermaid on the Titanic, a 1997 French-Italian-Spanish drama film
 The Chambermaid Lynn, a 2014 German drama film starring Vicky Krieps
 Chambermaid (EP), by Emilie Autumn, 2001